You Do Something to Me may refer to:
 You Do Something to Me (Cole Porter song)
 You Do Something to Me (Dum Dums song)
 You Do Something to Me (Paul Weller song)